Juan Antonio Agustin Coca Nogueres (born 31 May 1993 in San Juan) is a Puerto Rican footballer, who plays as a striker for Kultsu FC.

Career 
Coca started his career with the Eagles soccer team of the Colegio Adianez in Guaynabo and played club side for Conquistadores Guaynabo FC. He played until 2011 for the college and later began his senior career with Club Conquistadores de Guaynabo SC in the Puerto Rico Soccer League. He played three years for Guaynabo Fluminense FC before leaving for his studies at Notre Dame College in Ohio. During his studies, he spent a half year with National Premier Soccer League club Liverpool Warriors, but played only two games with the team. In June 2013, he signed for the reserve side of Spanish club Burgos CF in the Primera Categoria León.

On 20 March 2014, Coca signed for Kakkonen club Kultsu FC.

International 
Coca is a member of the Puerto Rico national football team and played his debut on 6 January 2012 in a friendly game against Nicaragua in the Bayamón Soccer Complex in Bayamón. Coca was also part of the preliminary squad for the 2012 FIFA U-20 World Cup and played in the 2013 CONCACAF Under 20 Championship in Mexico.

International goals
Scores and results list Puerto Rico's goal tally first.

References

1993 births
Living people
Puerto Rican footballers
Expatriate footballers in Spain
Burgos CF footballers
Expatriate footballers in Finland
Association football forwards
Puerto Rican expatriate sportspeople in Spain
Kultsu FC players
Puerto Rican expatriate footballers
Sportspeople from San Juan, Puerto Rico
Puerto Rican expatriates in Finland
Expatriate soccer players in the United States
Puerto Rico international footballers